The Brunei People's Awareness Party (Parti Kesedaran Rakyat Brunei, PAKAR) was a political party in Brunei. Although legally registered as a political party in Brunei, it was not able to gain electoral representation as legislative elections had not been held in Brunei since 1962. The party was deregistered in 2007 or 2008.

Political parties in Brunei